Project Indy was a car racing team owned by Andreas Leberle that competed in the CART Championship Car series and the Indy Racing League IndyCar Series. Leberle was a former chief mechanic for Euromotorsport, and like Euromotorsport, Project Indy's cars were often driven by pay drivers.  The team was founded in 1994 and operated through the 1998 CART season. Their only appearance in the IRL was with Johnny Unser for two of the three races of the 1996 season and the two 1996 races of the 1996–1997 season, which were competed with CART-spec equipment. The best race finish registered by a Project Indy driver was 7th place by Christian Danner in the 1995 Marlboro Grand Prix of Miami. In 1998 the team was known as Project CART due to not being allowed to use the Indianapolis Motor Speedway's "Indy" trademark as the team by then only participated in CART.

The team attempted the Indianapolis 500 several times but only succeeded in making the field in 1996 with Unser; their car did not start due to a broken transmission.

Drivers

CART
 Christian Danner (1994–1995)
 Franck Fréon (1994–1995)
 Buddy Lazier (1995)
 Arnd Meier (1997)
 Andrea Montermini (1994)
 Roberto Moreno (1998)
 Domenico Schiattarella (1994–1995, 1998)
 Hubert Stromberger (1995)
 Dennis Vitolo (1996–1997)

IRL
 Johnny Unser (1996)

Racing results

Complete CART FedEx Championship Series results
(key)

Complete Indy Racing League results
(key)

References

1994 establishments in the United States
1998 disestablishments in the United States
Champ Car teams
IndyCar Series teams
American auto racing teams